The Van Ness Mausoleum was designed by George Hadfield.  It is said to be a copy of the Temple of Vesta in Rome.

History
The mausoleum was constructed in 1824 for the daughter, Ann Elbertina Middleton, and granddaughter, Marcia Helen Middleton, of Washington City mayor John Peter Van Ness and Marcia Burns Van Ness. Built at an estimated cost of $34,000 with space for 18, it ultimately held 7, including John Peter Van Ness, who was interred inside in 1847. The mausoleum was moved by Colonel W. H. Philip to Oak Hill Cemetery in the Georgetown section of Washington, D.C., in 1872. The structure was put on the National Register of Historic Places in 1982.

See also
 List of public art in Washington, D.C., Ward 2

Notes

External links

 Oak Hill Cemetery at National Park Service
 
 

Burials at Oak Hill Cemetery (Washington, D.C.)
Georgetown (Washington, D.C.)
Monuments and memorials on the National Register of Historic Places in Washington, D.C.
Individually listed contributing properties to historic districts on the National Register in Washington, D.C.
Buildings and structures completed in 1824
Neoclassical architecture in Washington, D.C.
Renaissance Revival architecture in Washington, D.C.
Relocated buildings and structures in Washington, D.C.
Mausoleums on the National Register of Historic Places
1824 establishments in Washington, D.C.